The BR-280 is a Brazilian federal highway that connects the cities of São Francisco do Sul, in the state of Santa Catarina, to Dionísio Cerqueira, Santa Catarina. It has a total length of 642.2 km.

Starting from São Francisco do Sul, it crosses important cities in the extreme north of Santa Catarina, such as Joinville, Araquari, Guaramirim, Jaraguá do Sul, Corupá, São Bento do Sul, Rio Negrinho, Mafra, Canoinhas and Porto União to the state of Paraná, in which it travels to the extreme south of that state, crossing other important municipalities such as Pato Branco, Palmas, Francisco Beltrão and Clevelândia.

The highway is very important in the region for the flow of agricultural crops and industrialized products, especially to the Port of São Francisco do Sul.

In the municipality of Mafra, the road reaches an altitude of almost 1,000 meters above sea level.

Duplication

In April 2018, DNIT began working on the doubling of 74 km of BR-280, between São Francisco do Sul and Jaraguá do Sul. The project foresees a change in its route, which will stop passing through the central urban perimeter of Jaraguá do Sul, once again being a single lane near the border of this municipality with Corupá.

In August 2020, the first duplicated 5.5 km stretch of road was delivered.

References

Federal highways in Brazil